Braissat is a village located in Bsharri District in the North Governorate of Lebanon. It borders Dimane and Hadath El Jebbeh.

See also
 List of cities and towns in Lebanon

References

Populated places in the North Governorate